La Radio de Sudcalifornia is the state radio network of the Mexican state of Baja California Sur. It broadcasts on seven FM and one AM transmitters in the state with most content originating from the state capital in La Paz. All of the FM transmitters are on 99.1 MHz.

History
The history of the BCS state radio network begins in 1983 with the state government obtaining an authorization for daytime-only XEBCS-AM 1050 (originally to be XEPAZ-AM).

In order to facilitate the expansion of the state network and its move to FM, the BCS state government, through the State Radio and Television Institute, obtained an AM-FM migration authorization for XEBCS, which awarded it XHEBCS-FM 99.9, authorized for 9.92 kW ERP. However, the state government also obtained a series of permits for radio stations on 99.1 MHz in Baja California Sur, including XHBCP-FM 99.1 in La Paz, which is currently an AM-FM combo with XEBCS.

In 2022, the Los Cabos transmitter began airing some separate programming for southern Baja California Sur.

Transmitters
Except for XEBCS-AM 1050 AM (10 kW day) and the unbuilt XHEBCS, all of the state radio transmitters broadcast on 99.1 MHz.

External links
 Radio Locator information on XEBCS

References

Radio stations in Baja California Sur
Public radio in Mexico